Mahmudabad (also Romanized as Maḩmūdābād) is a village in Garamduz-e Sharqi Rural District of Garamduz District, Khoda Afarin County, East Azerbaijan province, Iran. At the 2006 National Census, its population was 1,058 in 215 households, when it was in the former Garamduz Rural District of Khoda Afarin District, Kaleybar County. The following census in 2011 counted 1,074 people in 255 households, by which time its district had risen to the status of Khoda Afarin County. The latest census in 2016 showed a population of 1,138 people in 326 households; it was the largest village in its rural district.

References 

Khoda Afarin County

Populated places in East Azerbaijan Province

Populated places in Khoda Afarin County